Heavenly Handel: Arias and Duets is the title of a music recording Virgin Classics released on two compact discs in early 2004. It is a performance of arias and duets from operas by Georg Friedrich Händel.

The Virgin Classics catalog number for "Heavenly Handel" is 5624002.

Track listing 

The following list shows the tracks of this recording.

First compact disc 

 
 
 
 
 
 
 
 Hercules: Where shall I fly
 
 Giulio Cesare: How silently, how slyly
 Giulio Cesare: Upstart, barbarian and traitor
 Giulio Cesare: Flow my tears
  As steals the morn upon the night

Second compact disc

References 
 Information on "Heavenly Handel" on the web site of Virgin Classics

2004 compilation albums